Julián Retegui Barbería, also known as Retegi II (born in Eratsun, Navarre, Spain on October 10, 1954) is an ex-player of Basque pelota.  He is also called "El mago de Eratsun" (Spanish: "The wizard of Eratsun"), since he is considered one of the best Basque pelota players of all time.  He played as a foreplayer.

Nephew of Juan Ignacio Retegi (another pelotari who won the pelota championship six times, usually known as Retegi I), he started to get interested in the Basque pelota when he was a child.  He worked as a stonecutter and in the wood industry.  On July 14, 1974 he started his professional career as a pelotari in the Cinema frontón of Zarautz (Gipuzkoa), having as a partner another pelotari, Juaristi.  They were defeated by Azorena and Etxeandia by 22-21.  One year later, in 1975, he won his first championship, the 2nd Hand-Pelota singles championship.

He has been the pelotari who has singlehandedly won the 1st Hand-Pelota singles championship more times than any other player.  He has won a total of eleven times: every year from 1980 to 1988 and in 1990 and 1993.  He has also won the Spanish Championship in pairs: in 1988, 1990, 1991, 1995 and in 1997.  On December 13, 1997 he won his last prize, the Basque Championship of 4½ against Titin III in the Ogeta Frontón of Gasteiz.  Since then, due to his regular lesions, he didn't win more prizes.  He played his last match on September 20, 2001, in the Adarraga frontón, Logroño, with Barriola against Olaizola II and Armendariz.  He lost 18-22.  In total, he has won 22 prizes, being the pelotari who has won the most prizes in the history of Basque pelota and has played around 1,407 matches, 843 of which he won.

For some years now he has been working in Asegarce, the company in which Karlos Arguiñano is a partner.  His son, Julen Retegi, is also a pelotari.  He debuted in the same town his father did, Zarauz, but in a different frontón called Aritzbatalde in July 2005.  He wears the name Retegi Bi in honour of his father (Bi means two in Basque, the number Julián wore), although the name should have been Retegi VIII due to their dynasty as pelotaris.

Championships

1st Hand-pelota singles championship 

Retegi participated for the first time in this championship in 1979, but he didn't win.  One year later he arrived at the finals and won against Maiz II.  From that day on he started his brilliant career, getting to the finals from 1980 to 1993, and winning the championship eleven times.

2nd hand-pelota singles championship

1st hand-pelota doubles championship

Cuatro y Medio Euskadi Championship

External links  
Pelotaris de Leyenda: Retegui II 

Living people
1954 births
Pelotaris from Navarre
Spanish pelotaris
People from Cuenca de Pamplona